The Lethbridge Steel are a women's football team in the Western Women's Canadian Football League competing in the Western Conference. Having first formed in 2010, the club formed a league with the Edmonton Storm and Calgary Rage known as the Alberta Female Football League (AFFL). In 2011, the Steel and the remainder of the AFFL clubs became part of the WWCFL.

The Steel are the 2012 and 2013 Western conference champions, losing out to the Saskatoon Valkyries in the league championships both years. THis result repeated itself again in 2019.

Year by year

References

Canadian football
Sport in Western Canada
Women's sports in Canada
Women in Alberta